Aulacia is a genus of leaf beetles in the subfamily Eumolpinae. It is distributed in Malaysia, Indonesia and the Philippines.

Species
 Aulacia bipustulata Baly, 1867
 Aulacia brunnea Jacoby, 1894
 Aulacia cechovskyi Medvedev, 2016
 Aulacia diversa Baly, 1867
 Aulacia femorata Baly, 1867
 Aulacia fulva Medvedev, 2004
 Aulacia fulviceps Baly, 1867
 Aulacia fulvicollis (Jacoby, 1899)
 Aulacia laeta Medvedev, 2004
 Aulacia montana Takizawa, 2017
 Aulacia nigella (Weise, 1922)
 Aulacia ornata Jacoby, 1896
 Aulacia riedeli Medvedev, 2004

Synonyms:
 Aulacia flavifrons Jacoby, 1896: synonym of Aulacia diversa Baly, 1867

References

Eumolpinae
Chrysomelidae genera
Beetles of Asia
Taxa named by Joseph Sugar Baly